Arnt Erik Dale (born 19 June 1960) is a Norwegian alpine skier. He was born in Oppdal, and represented the club Oppdal IL. He competed at the 1980 Winter Olympics in Lake Placid.

References

External links

1960 births
Living people
People from Oppdal
Norwegian male alpine skiers
Olympic alpine skiers of Norway
Alpine skiers at the 1980 Winter Olympics
Sportspeople from Trøndelag